JD Doyle (born September 24, 1947) is an American LGBT music and history archivist/historian and radio producer. He is a staff member of the weekly radio show Queer Voices and produces the monthly radio shows Queer Music Heritage and OutRadio. He now lives in Houston, Texas.

"Queer Music Heritage is both a radio show and a website, and the goal of both is to preserve and share the music of our culture, because I just don't think gay & lesbian music of the past should be forgotten."

Early life and career 
Doyle was born and raised in Salem, Ohio.
He moved to Norfolk, Virginia, in 1978, and joined the Unitarian Universalist Gay Community. As a member of the community, he was involved in many projects including hotline and speeches at college human sexuality classes.
Also, he worked at Our Own Community Press, a monthly all-volunteer newspaper of Unitarian Universalist Gay Community (UUGC) from 1978 to 1980, and was editor during 1979. The newspaper itself was published from 1976 through 1998. In 1981, he moved to Houston, Texas.
He participated in The National March on Washington For Lesbian & Gay Rights, on October 14, 1979, and reported it on Our Own Community Press.

Queer music collection 
Doyle was always an avid record collector since the early 1970s. He collected music from mostly the 1950s and 1960s from many genres. In early 1990s, he changed focus and sold his huge collection. However, he kept the gay artists and began specializing in queer music in the mid-1990s.
Queer music, according to him, is the music of LGBT artists, with a special emphasis on lyrics that deal with queer topics, and the lives as LGBT people. For LGBT artists, queer content is not a prerequisite, and conversely music by straight artists with queer content qualifies. Its genres include disco, blues, hip hop, country, punk, etc., and a number of shows on special areas including Gay Musicals, songs about Gay Marriage, AIDS, Bear Music, Drag Queen, Gay Christian Music, a number of shows on Transgender artists, etc.
He likely has the largest private collection in the world; he has more than 6000 items that include albums, CDs, singles, MP3 files.

Radio shows

First radio broadcast 
Doyle's friend Jimmy Carper was the producer of KPFT's LGBT radio program After Hours and after Doyle made several requests that more queer music be played, Carper invited him to come on the show and do a couple segments. Jack Valinski, the producer of Queer Voices (then, Lesbian & Gay Voices), offered him a regular segment on that show, which he was glad to accept.

Queer Voices 
Doyle co-hosted Queer Voices from 2000 to 2008, and continues to make guest appearances. Queer Voices, a weekly hour-long radio program on Pacifica radio's Houston affiliate KPFT, is dedicated to broadcasting news, concerns and events as related to Houston's Gay, Lesbian, Bisexual and Transgender (LGBT) community. The goal of Queer Voices is to provide up to date information on the community's concerns that is currently not available from other local media outlets. There are usually four or five hosts and three or four guests per show. The show is heard on Pacifica's KPFT 90.1 FM in Houston, Texas on Mondays, 8 to 9 pm, Central Time. Queer Voices includes the segments 'Queer Music Heritage', 'Leztopia' and 'This Way Out'.

Queer Music Heritage 
Queer Music Heritage, also called QMH, is a monthly one-hour-long radio show that introduces queer music. The first one hour is presented on 4th Monday of Queer Voices.
QMH was founded by Doyle in January 2000, and its goal is to preserve and share the music of queer culture. The first six episodes were 30-minutes-long, but it lengthened to be 1-hour-long afterwards. QMH includes interviews with musicians and songs of a certain theme for each episode. While the first hour of the show airs on Queer Voices, the monthly shows are normally more than one hour (and have been as long as eight hours, depending on the amount of material).
The June 2004 show "Queer Music before the Stonewall" won a Special Merit Award in the category of Local Music/Entertainment Program at the National Federation of Community Broadcasting conference. QMH celebrated its 15th anniversary in January 2015, and its last broadcast show was in March of that year. Doyle ended the show in order to devote more time to his new history websites, but all programs will remain archived and a total of 580 hours is available for download.

Audiofile 
"Audiofile" was a monthly radio queer music review carried by This Way Out, an international gay and lesbian radio magazine, on over 200 stations around the world.
Each "Audiofile" segment was approximately seven minutes long, and showcased three recent CDs by GLBT artists. This Way Out is a weekly 30-minute show and included "Audiofile" monthly during the last week of the month. This Way Out was delivered by Queer Voices.
It was founded by Chris Wilson, Pam Marshall, and the engineer Christopher David Trentham in January 1997. JD Doyle became a co-producer of "Audiofile" when Pam Marshall left the team in the beginning of 2001. The segment was discontinued in December 2010, to allow the co-producers to pursue other projects. All segments of the 14-year show are archived at http://queermusicheritage.com/af.html

OutRadio 
Doyle began a new monthly internet music show, OutRadio in January 2010.
While the purpose of QMH was to focus more on the history of the music of GLBT artists, that did not allow enough time to give exposure to new music, so OutRadio allows for that, and like QMH can be composed of nearly any music genre, with a running time not fixed, but shows are usually three hours in length.  This show was also discontinued in March 2015 at the same time as the main QMH program.

LGBT History Projects

Texas Obituary Project
In January 2014, after a year of planning and research, Doyle launched the website 'Texas Obituary Project'. An online searchable database, the goal was to include all obituaries that had appeared in the publication 'This Week in Texas', and other LGBT Texas publications, focusing especially on the "AIDS years" of 1982 through 2000, but beginning in 1976. Data continues to be added as access to archival publications becomes available. Beyond the ordinarily dry nature of such data, the website provides information on those lost, especially to AIDS, not accessible without archive access. It therefore can make this data available not only to historians but to those left behind, providing closure and a personal connection.
The project attracted statewide media attention and featured articles appeared in OutSmart Magazine (Houston) and in The Dallas Voice.

Houston LGBT History
Begun in 2012 but greatly expanded in 2014, the website HoustonLGBThistory.org  is a growing resource of mostly Houston information but also including much that is statewide, beginning in the 1960s. The site offers information in several areas. For example, every Houston Pride Guide is downloadable as a PDF file for research, and a section documents Pride logos and slogans and those elected as Pride Grand Marshals. Extensive statewide information is available on the bars, businesses and organizations, which gives insight of cultural changes over the decades. Another growing section is on LGBT publications, not only documenting what existed but in many cases offering the ability to download entire issues of the newspapers and magazines.

The Banner Project
Doyle was part of a project team that created The Banner Project, an exhibition of Houston LGBT history in the form of a pop-up museum and website. The display initially consisted of 27 panels, each 30 x 65 inches, printed on vinyl banners, giving a dramatic visual and educational impact. While the physical display gives a quick look at pivotal points in the city's LGBT history, a website is available with short essays on the significance of each banner. The display debuted at the 2014 Creating Change Conference held in Houston, January 29-February 2, 2014, and has had additional showings at several Gala events, such as the annual Human Rights Campaign dinner on April 5, 2014.

Over the years, the Banner Project has been displayed at the Anderson Library at the University of Houston during Coming Out Month in October of each year, for several years at the Transgender Unity Banquet, and Pride Night at  Rockets Basketball in April 2021. The total number of banners now stands at 48, with more planned for the future.

JD Doyle Archives

The JD Doyle Archives was established in November 2015 as an IRS-approved 501c3 non-profit foundation, with a main webpage located at www.jddoylearchives.org.  That page serves as the umbrella directory for all of the history websites, and provides additional information about the organization.

Publications

Doyle's work

Doyle in Media

Awards and Achievements

References

External links 
 JD Doyle Archives
 Queer Music Heritage
 OutRadio
 Audiofile
 Texas Obituary Project
 Houston LGBT History

Living people
American radio producers
LGBT people from Ohio
LGBT people from Texas
LGBT people from Virginia
People from Houston
Writers from Norfolk, Virginia
People from Salem, Ohio
1947 births